The Oak Grove-Freedman's Cemetery is a historic cemetery located at the corner of Liberty Street and North Church Street in downtown Salisbury, North Carolina. The cemetery has served as a burial ground for African Americans since it was deeded to the city in 1770. More than one hundred fifty known and unknown African Americans, both enslaved and free, are buried at the cemetery.

The Freedman cemetery is part of a larger cemetery parcel known now as the Old English Cemetery, which is home to the graves of soldiers who died in the Battle of Camden in 1780 and to British soldiers who died in Salisbury during Cornwallis' occupation of the city.  The two cemeteries were not separated physically until 1842 when a wooden fence was erected around the Old English Cemetery per the will of William Gay. This fence effectively separated the burial sites of African Americans and whites for the first time.  In 1855, the fence was replaced with a granite wall, which remains standing today.  Between 1903-1940, portions of the Freedman's Cemetery have been violated causing bodies to disintegrate and markers to be removed. The last standing markers were noted in 1940. The City of Salisbury assumed ownership of the cemetery in 1975, at which time the cemetery was closed to future burials.

In 1998 the Waterworks Visual Arts Center, under the support of the National Endowment for the Arts and other local organizations, embarked on an eight-year effort to restore parts of the cemetery and erect a public art memorial to honor the historic site. Artist Maggie Smith and landscape architect Sam Reynolds were hired to design and create the memorial which was dedicated on Martin Luther King, Jr. Day, January 16, 2006. Maggie Smith said of the project that, "the restoration and memorialization of the Oak Grove-Freedman's Cemetery has one primary goal: to symbolically and literally bring the desecrated part of the cemetery back into the community's embrace."

References

Cemeteries on the National Register of Historic Places in North Carolina
Salisbury, North Carolina
Geography of Rowan County, North Carolina
Tourist attractions in Rowan County, North Carolina
National Register of Historic Places in Rowan County, North Carolina